Middleton Hall is a country house near the settlement of Middleton, Northumberland, in that parish, that dates from 1871. It is listed Grade II on the National Heritage List for England.

Middleton Hall sits on a private  estate which includes two large lakes. The Main Hall has 10 bedrooms and is currently being operated as an exclusive hire multiuse estate. It currently has three other properties on its grounds: a boathouse, a folly and the Lake Cottages. The hall recently featured in The Times Best 100 British Holiday destinations.

References

External links 

Country houses in Northumberland
Grade II listed buildings in Northumberland
Grade II listed houses
Houses completed in 1871
Houses in Northumberland